The 2021 Ukrainian Athletics Championships was the national championship in outdoor track and field for athletes in Ukraine. It was held between 18 and 20 June at the Avanhard Stadium in Lutsk.

Results

Men

Women

References

External links 
 Ukrainian Athletic Federation website 

Ukrainian Athletics Championships
Ukrainian Athletics Championships
Ukrainian Athletics Championships
Sport in Lutsk